Yeelanna may refer to:
 Yeelanna, South Australia
 Yeelanna (genus), an insect genus in the family Pyrgomorphidae